Robert J. Sharer (March 16, 1940 – September 20, 2012) was an American archaeologist, academic and Mayanist researcher. He was known for his archaeological investigations at a number of pre-Columbian Mesoamerican sites conducted over a career spanning four decades, and for his archaeological reports, theorizing, and writings in his field of specialty, the ancient Maya civilization. Sharer was a lecturer and professor at the University of Pennsylvania's Department of Anthropology for more than 30 years, and  occupied the endowed chair of Sally and Alvin V. Shoemaker Professor in Anthropology, an appointment which he held beginning in 1995. He also had an extensive association with Penn's University Museum of archaeology and anthropology, where from 1987 to 2009 he was the curator-in-charge of the Museum's American collection and research section. He died on September 20, 2012.

He was the author of Daily Life in Maya Civilization (Greenwood Press 2009), which appeared in two editions; and, with Loa P. Traxler, The Ancient Maya (Stanford University Press, 2006), which appeared in six editions.

See also

Notes

References

 
 
 

American archaeologists
Mayanists
American Mesoamericanists
Mesoamerican archaeologists
20th-century Mesoamericanists
21st-century Mesoamericanists
American curators
University of Pennsylvania faculty
1940 births
2012 deaths